Tracy Bale is an American neuroscientist and molecular biologist. Bale is a professor and Director of the Center for Epigenetic Research in Child Health and Brain Development at the University of Maryland School of Medicine. Her research has centered on the role of parental, prenatal, and early life stress on the developing brain and subsequent behavior throughout the lifespan. She is also the current President of the  International Brain Research Organization.

Early life and education 
Tracy Bale received her B.S. from Washington State University in molecular biology and genetics in 1992. After taking a gap year, she then began her doctoral studies in Neurobiology at the University of Washington, studying under Daniel Dorsa. She received her Ph.D. in 1997. She then became a postdoctoral fellow at the Salk Institute, researching neuroendocrinology under the supervision of Wylie Vale.

Career and research 
Bale joined the faculty at the University of Pennsylvania in 2003. While at the University of Pennsylvania, she became co-director of the Penn Center for the Study of Sex and Gender in Behavioral Health and the Director of Research for the BIRCWH Faculty Scholars and of the Neuroscience Center at the School of Veterinary Medicine. In 2017, she moved her lab to the University of Maryland School of Medicine.

Bale's research focuses on parental prenatal stress and how it can affect offspring in a myriad of ways, mostly in terms of brain development and behavior. She has examined these questions for the perspective of both mothers and fathers. When mothers experience stress during the first stage of development, their offspring tend to be more sensitive to stress themselves. In fathers, these changes result from epigenetics, where microRNAs can change the epigenetic marks of sperm coming from stressed fathers.

Awards and honors 
 National Science Foundation Young Investigator Award (1997)
 American Neuroendocrine Society Fellowship (2001)
 Frank Beach Award, Society for Behavioral Neuroendocrinology (2003)
 McCabe Fellow Award (2003)
 Ziskind-Somerfeld Award, Society for Biological Psychiatry (2008)
 Career Development Award, Society for Neuroscience (2008)
 Richard E. Weitzman Award, Endocrine Society(2011)
 Medtronic Award, Society for Women's Health Research (2012)
 Daniel H. Efron Award, American College of Neuropsychopharmacology

References 

1969 births
Living people
American neuroscientists
American women biologists
American molecular biologists
21st-century American biologists
21st-century American women scientists
American women neuroscientists
Women molecular biologists
Washington State University alumni
University of Washington alumni
University of Maryland School of Medicine faculty
University of Pennsylvania faculty
American women academics